Maya Indea Jama (born 14 August 1994) is an English television presenter and radio DJ. She co-presented BBC One's Peter Crouch: Save Our Summer alongside Peter Crouch and Alex Horne and was the presenter of the BBC Three competition Glow Up: Britain's Next Make-Up Star for the third and fourth series and ITV2’s dating series Love Island.

Jama co-presented Trending Live! on 4Music from 2015 until 2017, Cannonball on ITV in 2017, the MTV show True Love or True Lies in 2018, and the first series of The Circle with Alice Levine on Channel 4. In radio, Jama hosted #DriveWithMaya on Rinse FM from 2014 to 2017, and co-presented Radio 1's Greatest Hits and presented her eponymous show, Maya Jama on BBC Radio 1 from 2018 to 2020. In 2023, Jama took over as the host of the popular ITV2 dating reality series, Love Island.

Early life
Jama was born and raised in Bristol, where she attended Cotham School. She is of Somali descent on her father's side and Swedish descent on her mother's side. Her mother, Sadie, was 19 when she gave birth to Jama, and she named her after the US author and poet Maya Angelou. She also has a brother.

Jama's father was in prison for most of her childhood, for violence-related crimes such as pub brawls and fights. Aged 12, she decided to stop visiting her father in prison and for a decade blocked him from her thoughts. She said in a 2017 interview with The Guardian that she didn't really notice it being a problem: "It was normal for me. My dad's side of my family was super-supportive and they did everything in their power to make me and my brother not feel like we were missing out on anything". While working on the documentary When Dads Kill in 2017, which dealt with young people's experiences similar to her own childhood, she relented and examined her relationship with her own father, by then released from prison, meeting with him in an attempt to elicit answers directly from him; "nothing he said, and nothing his family told her, gave her any real insights" into why he had ended up in prison.

Jama remains close to her mother and occasionally the two appear on talk shows together and attend private celebrity events.

Career

Television
In 2012, Jama moved to London to pursue a media career, first as an actress, then as a TV presenter and fashion model. Acting had been Jama's first ambition, but realised that becoming a presenter might suit her better. Her early role models included Davina McCall and June Sarpong. Jama began her presenting debut as a teenager, presenting the weekly music video countdown on JumpOff.TV, and later worked for Sky UK on TRACE Sports.

In 2014, she hosted Maya's FIFA World Cup Cities for Copa90, a travelogue covering the 2014 FIFA World Cup in Brazil. She also co-hosted the Copa90 nine-part World Cup Taxi series dedicated to the event. In August 2014, Jama joined MTV as a presenter for The Wrap Up.

In February 2017, she worked closely with Brit Awards, hosting their 2017 Pre-Brit Awards Party and hosting a Facebook live stream from the red carpet. In September 2017, she co-presented the Saturday night game show Cannonball on ITV with Andrew Flintoff, Frankie Bridge, Radzi Chinyanganya and Ryan Hand. In September 2017 and February 2018, Jama was a guest panellist on ITV's Loose Women. In November 2017, she became the youngest person (then 23) to co-host the MOBO Awards on Channel 5 with fellow presenter Marvin Humes.

In September 2018, Jama co-presented the first series of The Circle on Channel 4 with Alice Levine. In October 2018, she co-presented Stand Up to Cancer with long-standers Alan Carr and Adam Hills, and became the team captain on ITV2 rap panel show Don't Hate the Playaz presented by Jordan Stephens. In 2019, she appeared on A League of Their Own Road Trip alongside actor and comedian Tom Davis. She appeared on Channel 4's The Big Fat Quiz of the Year in 2019 and 2020.

In early June 2020, she presented the Saturday evening BBC One TV programme Peter Crouch: Save Our Summer. Later that year she co-presented BBC One's New Year's Eve programme The Big New Year's In. In January 2021, the BBC announced that Jama would be the new presenter of Glow Up: Britain's Next Make-Up Star, replacing former presenter Stacey Dooley, who presented the first two series of the programme. In February 2021, Jama appeared as a celebrity guest judge during the second series of RuPaul's Drag Race UK. In September 2021, it was announced that Jama would be the host of Simon Cowell’s new music competition gameshow Walk The Line.

In October 2022, it was announced that Jama would take over from Laura Whitmore as the presenter of ITV2 dating reality series Love Island.

Radio
Between 2014 and 2017, she hosted #DriveWithMaya, a weekday show on Rinse FM.

In 2018, she joined BBC Radio 1, presenting Radio 1's Greatest Hits on Saturdays and co-presenting every Friday with Scott Mills and Chris Stark. From 2018 to 2020, she presented her own show, Maya Jama on Fridays and Saturdays on BBC Radio 1.

On 15 May 2020, the BBC confirmed in a statement that Jama had left Radio 1 after two years. It said she'd made "the difficult decision not to continue her Radio 1 contract" and her final show was already broadcast on 3 May 2020. In an Instagram post, Jama said she had "a lot of exciting commitments" planned for the future, which meant she couldn't continue with her broadcasting segment at Radio 1. She added: "I would like to thank the team for their hard work and friendship during the last two years."

Other work
In 2018, Jama hosted When Life Gives You Melons, a podcast available to streaming platforms in partnership with Freya Lingerie. The podcast featured Jama interviewing all-female guests about work, life and relationships. Guests included Cherry Healey, Vick Hope, Anna Richardson, Vanessa White, Katie Piper, Gemma Cairney and Laura Whitmore.

That same year, Jama became an ambassador for Savera UK which operates across the United Kingdom to provide services to individuals who have experienced or are at risk of ‘Honour’ Based Abuse (HBA) and Harmful Practices. In 2019, she donated blood for an NHS campaign and was found to have the rare and in demand Ro blood subtype.

She also launched a successful clothing collection with PrettyLittleThing in June 2018, followed by a second collection in February 2019.

She is an ambassador for Adidas, and appeared in the European JD Sports Christmas campaign, and is also an ambassador for the Australian hair care brand Aussie. She also appeared in a global GAP campaign and in a Spring/Summer 2019 campaign for Kurt Geiger.

In December 2020, Jama launched her own face and eye masks range, MIJ Masks, with the first release selling out within 24 hours.

Personal life
Jama lives in West London. She is a keen football fan and supports both Bristol Rovers and West Ham United.

In 2018, a tweet that Jama made when she was 17 surfaced, which detailed her laughing at a tweet that mocked dark-skinned black women. After being accused of colourism, she apologised, stating that she was "an ignorant, stupid child" when the social media post was made in 2012.

Between 2015 and 2019, Jama was in a relationship with British rapper Stormzy; their break-up inspired his 2019 song "Lessons".  
In 2021, it was reported Jama was dating NBA player Ben Simmons. In August 2022, the couple reportedly ended their engagement.

Filmography

Awards
In November 2019, she won the People's Choice Award for best dressed star. Jama later opened and hosted the 2020 EE BAFTA red carpet in a 5G powered AR dress.

References

External links
 

1994 births
BBC Radio 1 presenters
English people of Somali descent
English people of Swedish descent
English television presenters
Living people
Mass media people from Bristol
Black British television personalities
Black British radio presenters